The Journal of Psychiatric and Mental Health Nursing is a bimonthly peer-reviewed medical journal covering psychiatric and mental health nursing. It was established in 1994 and is published by John Wiley & Sons. The editor-in-chief is Lawrie Elliott (Glasgow Caledonian University). According to Journal Citation Reports, the journal has a 2020 impact factor of 2.952, ranking it 14th out of 122 journals in the category "Nursing (Social Science)".

References

External links

Publications established in 1994
Bimonthly journals
Wiley (publisher) academic journals
English-language journals
Psychiatric and mental health nursing journals